John O'Rourke (11 February 1945 – 7 July 2016) was a professional footballer. His position was centre forward.

During his career he played for Ipswich Town, Middlesbrough, Coventry City, Luton Town, Queens Park Rangers and AFC Bournemouth.

Such was his scoring success and popularity on Teesside that fans would sing "Give us a goal, John O'Rourke" to the tune of The Troggs song "Give It to Me". An £18,500 signing from Luton Town, he scored two on his debut at Colchester and went on to score 27 in 39 games as Boro clinched promotion from Division Three at the first attempt. This included a hat-trick in the crucial last match of the season, a 4–1 victory over Oxford United. The following season, 1967–68, he scored two further hat-tricks before moving to Ipswich Town in February 1968 for £30,000.

On 31 December 1966, while playing for Middlesbrough, O'Rourke was involved in a collision with Bristol Rovers goalkeeper Bernard Hall, which left Hall in a coma for sixteen days and ended his footballing career.

When his playing days were over, O'Rourke became a newsagent on the south coast. He died on 7 July 2016, aged 71 of cancer.

References

External links 
John O'Rourke profile at Ipswich Town Talk

1945 births
2016 deaths
England under-23 international footballers
Ipswich Town F.C. players
Coventry City F.C. players
Luton Town F.C. players
Middlesbrough F.C. players
Queens Park Rangers F.C. players
AFC Bournemouth players
Poole Town F.C. players
Rangers F.C. (South Africa) players
Weymouth F.C. players
Dorchester Town F.C. players
Footballers from Northampton
English footballers
Association football forwards